John Lindsay Brown (July 22, 1911 in Mason, Texas – January 1, 1967 in San Antonio, Texas), was a professional baseball player who played shortstop in the major leagues for the 1937 Brooklyn Dodgers.

External links

1911 births
1967 deaths
Major League Baseball shortstops
Baseball players from Texas
Brooklyn Dodgers players
Springfield Senators players
Beaumont Exporters players
Scranton Miners players
Toledo Mud Hens players
Fort Worth Cats players
Nashville Vols players
Columbus Red Birds players
Indianapolis Indians players
Portland Beavers players
Buffalo Bisons (minor league) players
Sherman–Denison Twins players
Ballinger Cats players
People from Mason, Texas